In Greek mythology, Demoleon (Ancient Greek: Δημολέων) may refer to the following characters:

 Demoleon, one of the centaurs who attended Pirithous' wedding and fought in the battle against the Lapiths. He was killed by Peleus.
 Demoleon, the Laconian son of Hippasus who came to Troy with their king Menelaus. During the Trojan War, he was slain by the hero-prince Paris.
 Demoleon, a Trojan warrior, son of Antenor and Theano. He was killed by Achilles.

Notes

References 

 Homer, The Iliad with an English Translation by A.T. Murray, Ph.D. in two volumes. Cambridge, MA., Harvard University Press; London, William Heinemann, Ltd. 1924. . Online version at the Perseus Digital Library.
 Homer, Homeri Opera in five volumes. Oxford, Oxford University Press. 1920. . Greek text available at the Perseus Digital Library.
 Quintus Smyrnaeus, The Fall of Troy translated by Way. A. S. Loeb Classical Library Volume 19. London: William Heinemann, 1913. Online version at theio.com
 Quintus Smyrnaeus, The Fall of Troy. Arthur S. Way. London: William Heinemann; New York: G.P. Putnam's Sons. 1913. Greek text available at the Perseus Digital Library.
 Publius Ovidius Naso, Metamorphoses translated by Brookes More (1859-1942). Boston, Cornhill Publishing Co. 1922. Online version at the Perseus Digital Library.
 Publius Ovidius Naso, Metamorphoses. Hugo Magnus. Gotha (Germany). Friedr. Andr. Perthes. 1892. Latin text available at the Perseus Digital Library.

Achaeans (Homer)